Beautiful Boyz is an EP by American musical group CocoRosie, released by Touch and Go Records on September 14, 2004. The EP is only available as a digital download, though physical CD promotional media for the EP exists. The EP has been described as alternative, art pop, folktronica, freak folk, indie, and lo-fi indie.

The first two tracks on the EP are the same as their namesakes on CocoRosie's debut album La Maison de Mon Rêve, though the eponymous track "Beautiful Boyz" differs from the Noah's Ark version, which features British singer Anohni. The track "Beautiful Boyz" is an homage to French novelist, playwright, and poet Jean Genet.

Reception 
Beautiful Boyz received favorable reviews. Google Play gave the EP an average rating of 4.7 stars out of 5 stars. Music website Rate Your Music ranked the EP the 210th best work of 2004 and gave it an average rating of 3.61 out of 5.

Track listing

References 

CocoRosie albums
2004 EPs
Touch and Go Records EPs